Herbert Roy "Tiger" Lance (6 June 1940 – 10 November 2010) was a South African cricketer.

Tiger Lance was born in Pretoria, Transvaal.  He played in 13 Tests matches between 1962 and 1970 as an all-rounder.  He was a forceful middle order batsman and useful seam bowler. His father William and his younger brother Anthony also played first-class cricket in South Africa.

His most successful series was against Australia in 1966–67, when he played several important innings after early wickets had fallen cheaply; he hit a six off the bowling of Ian Chappell to win not only the Fifth Test in Port Elizabeth, but also the series, South Africa's first series win against Australia in the eleventh series between the two countries. In the five Tests of the series he scored 261 runs at 37.28.

His form in domestic matches in 1969–70 was moderate and he was not selected for the First Test against Australia, but at the request of the captain Ali Bacher he was included in the side for the rest of the series. He was also selected for the 1970 tour of England and the 1971–72 tour of Australia, but neither series eventuated owing to anti-apartheid feeling in the host countries.

He retired after the 1971–72 season.

He died in hospital in Johannesburg, four weeks after the car he was driving was hit by a woman driving on the wrong side of the road.

References

External links
 

1940 births
2010 deaths
Cricketers from Pretoria
Gauteng cricketers
Northerns cricketers
South Africa Test cricketers
South African cricketers
Road incident deaths in South Africa
South African cricket coaches